The South West Area, Ipswich is one of five administrative areas in Ipswich, through which Ipswich Borough Council divides its spending and enables feedback from local residents, businesses and community groups.

The area is composed of four wards, each represented by three councillors. Each ward is also a Middle Layer Super Output Area (MSOA). As of the 2019 Ipswich Borough Council election, the councillors are as follows:

These Councillors form the South West Area Committee of which Tracy Grant is the chair.

The area is also covered by a Neighbourhood Watch network which comprises 35 neighbourhood watch schemes.

References

Areas in Ipswich
South West Area, Ipswich